The 70th Separate Guards Motor Rifle Brigade was a Soviet Ground Forces mechanized infantry brigade of the Soviet–Afghan War. During the war, it was based in Kandahar.

First Formation 
The brigade was formed on 1 March 1980 in Kandahar from the 373rd Guards Motor Rifle Regiment of the 5th Guards Motor Rifle Division. On 4 May 1985, it was awarded a second Order of the Red Banner for its actions in Afghanistan. In August 1988, it withdrew to Kushka. The brigade was disbanded in February 1989.

Second Formation 
The 17th Guards Rifle Division became the 123rd Guards Motor Rifle Division in 1957 and converted into the 129th Guards Machine-Gun Artillery Division in 1989. With the collapse of the Soviet Union, it became a Russian Ground Forces formation in May 1992. In 2001, it was converted to the 17th Guards Motor Rifle Division, and became the 70th Guards Motor Rifle Brigade in 2009. The brigade is currently based in Ussuriysk.

References

External links 
 Website dedicated to the brigade

Ground Forces brigades of the Soviet Union
Mechanised brigades
Military units and formations established in 1979
Military units and formations awarded the Order of the Red Banner